The freestyle skiing competition of the 1994 Winter Olympics was held at Kanthaugen Freestyle Arena.  There were four events, taking place between 15 and 24 February 1994. The freestyle program was expanded at this Olympics, with aerials, previously a demonstration event, added as a full medal event.

Medal summary

Medal table 

Canada led the medal table with one medal of each type. Five countries, Canada, Switzerland, Sweden and Uzbekistan, won their first Olympic freestyle medals. The gold medal won by Lina Cheryazova in the women's aerials was the first Olympic medal for Uzbekistan, and as of 2010, the only one won by that country at the Winter Games.

Men's Events

Women's Events

Participating NOCs

Twenty-one nations participated in freestyle skiing at Lillehammer. Austria, Belarus, China, Kazakhstan, the Netherlands, Russia, Ukraine and Uzbekistan made their debuts in the sport.

References

External links
Freestyle Skiing History: Olympics 1988-2002 

 
1994
1994 Winter Olympics events
1994 in freestyle skiing